Slovak, like most Slavic languages and Latin, is an inflected language, meaning that the endings (and sometimes also the stems) of most words (nouns, adjectives, pronouns and numerals) change depending on the given combination of  the grammatical gender, the grammatical number and the grammatical case of the particular word in the particular sentence:

a) Gender: There are four grammatical genders in Slovak: animate masculine, inanimate masculine, feminine, and neuter. In popular description, the first two genders are often covered under common masculine gender. Almost all Slovak nouns and adjectives, as well as some pronouns and numerals can be categorized into one of these genders. Exceptions are pluralia tantum ( – Christmas, though there are rules for deriving the gender), words that are drifting into another gender and are currently neuter ( – Fürst), and masculine animals that are animate in singular and mostly inanimate in plural.

b) Number: Like in English, Slovak has singular and plural nouns. Morphological traces of the ancient Indo-European dual number remain, but are not a separate grammar category anymore.
A particular case is associated with three distinct groups of numerals associated with nouns:
 1 (one) – nominative case singular, for example  (one oak)
 2, 3, 4 – nominative case plural, for example  (two oaks)
 0, 5 and more – genitive case plural, for example  (five [of] oaks)

c) Morphological cases:
 the nominative case (N) = the subject; the basic form of the word; answers the question Who / What; for example father (sg), fathers (pl)
 the genitive case (G) =
 (1) in English "of x" or "x's" ; answers the questions Of whom / Of what; for example father's (sg. ), fathers' (pl);
 (2) is used after the prepositions  (without),  (near),  (to, into),  (in(to) the middle of),  (out(side) of),  (instead of),  (around),  (from),  (according to),  (next to, around),  (by means of),  (along),  (at),  (in the middle of),  (next to, adjacent to),  (in, inside of),  (above),  (out of, from), * (behind)
 the dative case (D) =
(1) in English "to x"; answers the question To whom / To what; for example to the father (sg), to the fathers (pl);
(2) is used after the prepositions  (to, towards),  (because of),  (in spite of),  (facing, opposing),  ((facing, opposing)),  (facing, against)
 the accusative case (A) =
(1) the direct object; answers the question Whom / What; for example [I see the] father (sg), fathers (pl);
(2) is used after the prepositions: (through), * (between, among), * (on, at), * (above), * (after, for), * (about, on), * (under),  (for, because of), * (before, in front of), * (in, on),  (regarding, concerning), * (behind, for)
 the locative case (L) = used after the prepositions  * (on), * (after), * (about, on),  (at, next to), * (in, on)
the instrumental case (I) =
(1) in English "by (means of) x"; answers the question By (means of) whom / By (means of) what; for example [written] by the father;
(2) is used after the prepositions: * (between, among), * (above), * (under), * (before, in front of),  (with), * (behind, at the back of)
 The (syntactic) vocative case (V) is not morphologically marked anymore in modern Slovak (unlike in modern Czech). Today the (syntactic) vocative is realised by the (morphological) nominative case, just like in English, German and many other languages. However, the ancient vocative declensions have survived (mostly in conserved, archaic words or language, e.g. in fairy tales, folklore, or in an ironic sense) in some words, some examples: syn (son) – V: synku, brat (brother) – V: bratu, bratku), chlapec (boy, knave) – V: chlapče), švagor (brother-in-law) – V: švagre or N, kmotor (godparent) – V: kmotre or N), chlap (man, male) – V: chlape, priateľ (friend) V: priateľu or N, pán (mister, lord) – V: pane or N), majster (master artist) – V: majstre or N), boh (god) – V: bože, mama (mum, mother) – V: mamo, mami) and was retrofitted (with the help of Czech influence) to some more words, like šéf (chief, boss) – V: šéfe. There is a dispute among some Slovak linguists whether to include the vocative into the categories grammar, but with declension (mostly) equal to the nominative, or to unify it with the nominative case category. The morphological vocative is used only for the above restricted number of words and in addition only in some contexts (such as many dialects, which still use the vocative case). Note however that there is no dispute that the syntactic vocative exists in Slovak. Slovak schools have been teaching for at least 30 years that there is no grammar category of vocative anymore in use, however, the use of the vocative case in the past is often mentioned. The Slovak Encyclopedia of Linguistics (1993) explicitly says: the vocative is nowadays replaced by the nominative. However, the Slovak National Corpus explicitly includes vocative as a separate case in the morphological analysis and corpus tagset.

There is also a different form of morphological vocative emerging in spoken language, used with some familiar forms of personal names (Paľo - Pali, Jano, Jana - Jani, Zuza - Zuzi) and familiar forms of kinship words, such as mama – mami (mum, mother), oco – oci (dad, father), tata, tato – tati (dad, daddy), baba, babka – babi (gran, granny, grandmother). This usage is very similar to the "new Russian vocative" (Маш', Петь', мам'), but it is not accepted into standardised codified language. This could have developed out of proper names  that were formed using the Hungarian diminutive suffix -i and that are used in spoken Slovak, and therefore is often homonymous with nominative (semi-)diminutive forms of the names. Another possibility is influence from Czech (from common bilingual TV during Czechoslovakia), where Jani / Zuzi as well as mami / tati / babi is part of Common Czech.

Legend
 "ends in" in the following refers to the ending in the nominative singular (N sg), unless stated differently;
 Soft consonants are: all consonants with the diacritic mark ˇ (for example š, ľ) + c, dz, j. Hard and neutral consonants are all the remaining consonants;
 For masculine nouns, adjectives, pronouns and numerals it is necessary to distinguish between animate and inanimate ones. An animate noun is a person (for example father, Peter) and an inanimate noun is any other noun (for example  table, fear, democracy). Animals are usually viewed as persons only in sg. For the animate nouns, the G is identical with the A (both in sg. and in pl.), and for the inanimate nouns, the N is identical with the A (both in sg. and in pl.). Animate/Inanimate adjectives, pronouns and numerals are those referring to an animate/inanimate noun respectively (for example in "my father" the "my" is animate, because father is animate);
 sg = singular, pl = plural;
 N, G, D, A, L, I are abbreviations of grammatical cases (see above).

Nouns 
For each gender, there are four basic declension paradigms (that is declension models).

Note that many nouns (especially those following the paradigm chlap) have different endings than those of the paradigms in one or more grammatical cases. They are neither defined, nor listed in the following. The complete number of different paradigms for nouns is somewhere around 200.

A very small number of foreign nouns are not declined (that is the stem and ending never change).

The Masculine Gender

Sg: N: pony, G: ponyho, D: ponymu, A: ponyho, L and I: ponym;
Pl: like hrdina.

Masculine animal nouns are declined like chlap in the singular, but in plural usually like dub (if they end in a hard or neutral consonant) or like stroj (otherwise).

Notes on chlap:
 For the nouns ending in a vowel (for example  -o, -u) the vowel is not part of the stem, but the ending in N sg: for example dedo has G / D sg...  deda / dedovi etc. (not *dedoa / *dedoovi etc.)
 many nouns lose an e / o / i from the stem in all cases except N sg (for example vrabec – vrabca);
 in some short nouns, the -e- changes its position in all cases except N sg (for example žnec – ženca);
 some nouns ending in -k / -ch change their final /k/ or /ch/ into /c/ and /s/, respectively in N pl (for example žiak – žiaci);
 words ending in -h use the N pl ending for hrdina instead (such as vrah - vrahovia, súdruh - súdruhovia)
 most Latin and Greek nouns ending in -us, -as, -es lose it in all cases except N sg (for example génius – génia; but for example fiškus – fiškusa).

Notes on hrdina:

 Notes on dub:
 many nouns lose e / o / i / í / i.e. / á from the stem in all cases except N sg and A sg (for example výmysel – výmysla, chrbát – chrbta, ohníček – ohníčka, dnešok – dneška, ocot – octa )
 some Greek and Latin nouns in -us, -es, -os lose the -us / -es / -os in all cases except N sg and A sg (e.g. komunizmus – komunizmu; but e.g. autobus – autobusu, cirkus – cirkusu);
 some Slovak words lose the acute or the i / u from a diphthong in all cases except N sg and A sg (for example mráz – mraza, chlieb – chleba, vietor – vetra (here along with loss of o), stôl – stola, bôr – bora);
 in G pl, some nouns change the a / e / i / o / u (without an acute or a preceding i) in the stem to á / i.e. / í / ô / ú (raz – ráz, Vojany – Voján, Krompachy – Krompách, Žabokreky – Žabokriek, Poniky – Poník, sloha – slôh) or in some cases to ia / iu (for example čas – čias, Margecany – Margecian), unless the rhythmical rule prevents it, i.e. the preceding syllable in the stem already contains a vowel with an acute or a diphthong (for example Hájniky – Hájnik);
 in L sg, nouns ending in g / k / h have -u rather than -e.

 Notes on stroj:
 many nouns lose the e / o / i / í / i.e. / á in all cases except N sg and A sg (for example  – ,  – ,  – ,  – ,  – ,  – );
 some nouns lose the acute or the i/u from a diphthong in all cases except N sg and A sg (for example  – ,  – );
 in G pl, geographical names in pl. (plurale tantum) change the a / e / i / o / u (without an acute or a preceding i) in the stem to á / é / í / ó / ú (for example  – ) or in some cases to ia / i.e. / iu / ô (for example  – ) in the G pl, unless the rhythmical rule prevents it, i.e. the preceding syllable in the stem already contains an acute or a diphthong.

The Feminine Gender 

There is also a 5th paradigm for feminine nouns ending in -ná or -ovná (for example princezná), where the singular and N pl and A pl are like pekná (see under adjectives) and the remaining plural is like žena. In the G pl, there are changes in the stem: if the noun ends in -vowel + ná, then this vowel receives an acute (for example švagriná – švagrín), but otherwise -- is inserted (for example princezná – princezien).

There is also a 6th paradigm for the feminine nouns ending in -ea (idea, Kórea), which goes like žena, except that D sg and Lsg are idei, and G pl is ideí without change in the stem.

Notes on žena:
 The following nouns are declined like ulica instead of žena: večera, rozopra, konopa, Hybe and (the plurale tantum) dvere;
 In the G pl of some nouns, an i.e. / e / o / á / ô is inserted in the last syllable of the stem (for example hra – hier, čipka – čipiek/čipôk, karta – kariet/karát, kvapka – kvapiek/kvapák/kvapôk, vojna – vojen, látka – látok);
 In the  G pl of some nouns, in the last syllable of the stem the a / i / y / u / ä / e / o / syllabic r / syllabic l (without an acute or a preceding i) is changed into á (or ia) / í / ý / ú / ia /  / ô / ŕ / ĺ respectively (sila - síl, skala - skál, chyba – chýb, ruka – rúk, fakulta – fakúlt, päta – piat, slza – sĺz, črta – čŕt, brzda – bŕzd, slza – sĺz).

 Notes on ulica:
 In the G pl of some nouns  is inserted (for example jedľa – jedieľ, sukňa – sukieň);
 In the G pl of some nouns, in the last syllable of the stem the a / i / y / u / e / o / syllabic r (without an acute or a preceding i) is changed into á (or ia) / í / ý / ú /  / ô / ŕ respectively (for example ulica – ulíc, sudkyňa – sudkýň, Krkonoše – Krkonôš, košeľa – košieľ, guľa – gúľ, hoľa – hôľ, fľaša – fliaš).

Notes on dlaň:
 The following nouns are declined like dlaň, not like kosť: obec, päsť, čeľusť;
 The following feminine nouns are not declined like dlaň, but like kosť: jar, zver, chuť, ortuť, pamäť, smrť, pleť, sneť, rukoväť, smeť, púť, spleť, svojeť, reč, seč, meď, soľ, hluš, myš, voš, lož, bel, Sereď, Sibír, Budapešť, Bukurešť, Lešť and a few other nouns. The words myseľ, chuť, raž, tvár, hneď can be declined like dlaň or like kosť in the singular, but only like dlaň in the plural. The word hrsť is declined like dlaň in the singular, but like kosť in the plural. The word pamäť is declined like kosť when it refers to human memory, but like dlaň when it refers to computer memory;
 most nouns in -eň lose -e- in all cases except N sg and A sg (for example úroveň – úrovne).

Notes on kosť:
 see the first two notes under dlaň;
 some nouns lose -e-/-o- in all cases except N sg and A sg  (for example ves – vsi, lož – lži, cirkev – cirkvi).

The Neuter Gender 

For (any) neuter nouns ending in -vowel+um/on (for example štúdium, ganglion) there is actually a 5th paradigm (štúdium), which is declined like mesto except that the -um- / -on- is omitted in all cases except N sg and A sg., L sg ends in -u (štúdiu), and G pl in -í  (štúdií).

Notes on mesto:
Latin and Greek neuter nouns ending in consonant + -um/-on (for example fórum, epiteton) are declined like mesto, except that the -um/-on is omitted in all cases except N sg and A sg (for example, N sg and A sg: publikum, G sg: publika, D sg: publiku etc.);
in the G pl of some nouns, an ie/ e / o / á / (rarely é) is inserted in the last syllable of the stem (for example clo – ciel, mydlo –mydiel, zvieratko – zvieratiek, jedlo – jedál, vrecko – vrecák/vreciek, vlákno – vláken/vlákien, číslo – čísel / čísiel, lajno – lajen, lýtko – lýtok, teliesko – teliesok;
in the G pl of some nouns, in the last syllable of the stem, the a / i / y / u / ä / e / o / syllabic r / syllabic l (without an acute or a preceding i) is changed into á / í / ý / ú / ia /  / ô / ŕ / ĺ respectively (kladivo – kladív, zrno – zŕn).

Notes on srdce:
 In the G pl of some nouns, an ie/e is inserted in the last syllable of the stem (for example citoslovce – citosloviec, okience – okienec, vajce – vajec);
 In the G pl of some nouns, in the last syllable of the stem the a / i / y / u / ä / e / o / syllabic r / syllabic l (without an acute or a preceding i) is changed into á / í / ý / ú / ia /  / ô / ŕ / ĺ respectively (plece – pliec, srdce – sŕdc, slnce – sĺnc).

Notes on vysvedčenie:

Notes on dievča:
 The -a- at the beginning of all endings is replaced by ä after a labial consonant, i.e. p/b/m/f/v (for example žriebä – žriebäťa – žriebäťu...);
 Most nouns can take both the -at- endings and the -enc- endings in the plural (for example dievča, húsa, bábä), some nouns however take only the -at- endings (for example knieža, zviera, mláďa) and some nouns only the -enc- endings (for example kura). The following nouns do not take the -en- in the alternative plural endings: prasa (N pl prasatá/prasce, G pl prasiat/prasiec), teľa, šteňa.

Adjectives

Paradigms

Pekný
This paradigm is used for adjectives ending in a hard or neutral consonant + ý [in masculine]

Cudzí 
This paradigm is used for adjectives ending in -a soft consonant + í [in masculine] (including the comparative and superlative, see below);

Otcov 
This paradigm is used for adjectives ending in -ov / -in, for example otcov ("father's"), matkin ("mother's"). All of them are possessive adjectives (adjectives in -ov are derived from masculine nouns, adjectives in -in – from feminine nouns).

The Comparative and Superlative 
The comparative is formed by replacing the adjective ending -ý/y/i/í by -ejší  or  -ší. There are exact rules for the choice between these two endings and there are several irregular comparatives. Examples:
 Regular: hrozný – hroznejší, bohatý – bohatší…
 Irregular: veľký – väčší, malý – menší, dobrý – lepší, zlý – horší, pekný – krajší, čierny – černejší, blízky – bližší, ďaleký – ďaľší, hlboký – hlbší…
The comparative forms are declined like cudzí.

The superlative (that is biggest, most difficult etc.) is formed as follows: naj+comparative. Examples: pekný – krajší – najkrajší, hrozný – hroznejší – najhroznejší...

The comparative and superlative of adverbs (which, by the way, end in -o, -e  or -y in the basic form) is formed by simply replacing the -(ej)ší from the adjective by -(ej)šie (for example: pekne – krajšie – najkrajšie, hrozne – hroznejšie – najhroznejšie, teplo – teplejšie – najteplejšie, pomaly – pomalšie – najpomalšie).

Pronouns

Personal pronouns 

There is also the reflexive pronoun sa, which is declined as follows: N: –, G: seba, D: sebe / si, A: seba/sa, L: sebe, I: sebou

Notes:
 the long forms mňa, teba, seba, mne, tebe, sebe in G, D and A are used after prepositions (for example pre mňa) or when emphasized, especially always at the beginning of the sentence (for example Vidíš len seba., Teba vidím.);
 the forms jeho, jemu in G, D and A are used when emphasized, especially always at the beginning of the sentence (for example Vidím jeho. Jeho vidím = It is him that I see);
 the forms in n- (that is neho, nemu, nej, ňu, nich, nim, ne) are used after prepositions (for example pre neho (masc.)); the forms  -ňho (or -ň), -ňmu, -ň can be used alternatively after the prepositions do, pre, na, za, o, po, do, u (for example pre neho (masc.) = preňho = preň); the special form -eň can be used alternatively (for neuter nouns obligatorily) after the prepositions nad, ponad, cez, pod, popod, pred, popred (for example nad neho (masc.) = nadeň).

Demonstrative Pronouns 

like ten (that, the) are declined: tamten (that one), henten (that one), tento (this one), tenže (the same)...

like adjectives are declined: for example istý (certain, same), každý (each), iný (other), taký / onaký (such), všetok (all), sám (-self), onen (that one), and žiaden = žiadny (no one)...

Interrogative (and Relative) and Indefinite pronouns 
who: N: kto - G: koho – D: komu – A: koho – L: kom – I: kým [always masculine animate],
what: N: čo – G: čoho – D: čomu – A: čo – L: čom – I: čím [always neuter];

like kto/čo are declined: nikto (nobody), niekto / dakto (someone), niečo / dačo (something), hocikto (who ever), nič (nothing), ktosi (someone), čosi (something)...

like adjectives are declined: čí (whose), niečí / dačí / hocičí (someone's), ničí (no one's), ktorý (which), aký (what, which), nejaký / dajaký / (some), nijaký / niktorý (no), čísi (someone's), číkoľvek (whose ever). akýsi (some), ktorýsi (some), ktorýkoľvek (which ever)...

Possessive pronouns 
The following are the first person pronouns.

like môj (my) are declined:
 tvoj (your (sg.)) and svoj (one's own), except that the o never changes in ô (for example tvoj – tvojho...);
 náš (our) and váš (your (plural)), except that the -ô- in môj corresponds to an -á-, and an -o- in môj corresponds to an -a- here (for example náš – G: nášho – L: našom).

not declined are:
 jeho (his), jej (her), ich (their).

Numerals

Cardinal Numerals

Paradigms 
jeden (one): declined like the adjective pekný;

 Changes for compound numerals in jeden: not declined; see Compound Numerals.

dva (two): N: dvaja (masc. animate); dva (masc. inanimate); dve (otherwise) – G: dvoch – D: dvom – A: dvoch (masc. animate); dva (masc. inanimate); dve (otherwise) – L: dvoch – I: dvoma;

 Changes for compound numerals in dva:
 N: dvaja / dva (masc. animate); dva (otherwise),
 A: dvoch / dva (masc. animate); dva (otherwise);

Also declined like dva: obidva / oba (both), and (with the above changes) the second part of the compound numerals 32, 42... 92, if they are declined (see Compound Numerals).

tri (three): N: traja (masc. animate); tri (otherwise) – G: troch – D: trom – A: troch (masc. animate); tri (otherwise) – L: troch – I:  troma / tromi.

Changes for compound numerals in tri, štyri:
 N: traja / tri (masc. animate); tri (otherwise),
 A: troch / tri (masc. animate); tri (otherwise);
 Also declined like tri: štyri (4), and (with the above changes) the second part of the compound numerals 23, 33, 43… 93; 24, 34, 44… 94, if they are declined (see Compound Numerals).

päť (five): N: piati / päť (masc. animate); päť (otherwise) – G: piatich – D: piatim – A: piatich / päť (masc. animate); päť (otherwise) – L: piatich – I: piatimi;

 Also declined like päť: the numerals päť (6) to 19 (19), and  20, 30, 40, 50, 60, 70, 80, 90,  and the second part of the compound numerals 25–29, 35–39 ... 95–99, if they are declined (see Compound Numerals).

100, 200, 300... 900; 1000, 2000, 3000... 9000: not declined, but 1000 can be declined like päť.

Compound Numerals 
 if they end in -jeden (for example 21, 101):
 not declined;
 otherwise:
 2 alternatives: not declined or declined; if they are declined, then each number making up the numeral is declined according to its own paradigm (for example 23 chlapov: dvadsiatich troch chlapov).

Ordinal Numerals
They are declined like adjectives (paradigms pekný and cudzí).

Note: Ordinal numerals are formed by adding adjective endings to the (slightly modified) cardinal numbers, for example: 
5: päť – 5th: piaty,
20: dvadsať – 20th: dvadsiaty.

References

External links
provides an exhaustive treatment of Slovak declension and is the source of this article

Slovak language
Declension